Yordan Mitkov (born April 3, 1956) is a former Bulgarian weightlifter. He was born in Asenovgrad.

Mitkov became Olympic champion in 1976 in the middleweight class.

References

1956 births
Living people
Bulgarian male weightlifters
Weightlifters at the 1976 Summer Olympics
Olympic gold medalists for Bulgaria
People from Asenovgrad
Olympic medalists in weightlifting
Medalists at the 1976 Summer Olympics
20th-century Bulgarian people
21st-century Bulgarian people